The women's 400 metres at the 2011 Asian Athletics Championships was held at the Kobe Universiade Memorial Stadium on 7 and 8 July.

The original gold and silver medallists, Kazakhstan's Olga Tereshkova and Iraq's Gulustan Ieso, were later disqualified after testing positive for testosterone and methylhexaneamine, respectively. Initial bronze medallist Chen Jingwen of China was elevated to the gold medal position, while fourth and fifth placed runners Chandrika Subashini and Chisato Tanaka moved into the minor medal positions.

Medalists

Records

Schedule

Results

Round 1
First 3 in each heat (Q) and 2 best performers (q) advance to the finals.

Final

References

2011 Asian Athletics Championships
400 metres at the Asian Athletics Championships
2011 in women's athletics